Paul Berg (1926–2023) was an American biochemist and Nobel laureate.

Paul Berg also refers to:

Paul Berg (composer), Dutch professor of music
Paul Berg (snowboarder) (born 1991), German snowboarder
Paul Berg (photographer), American photojournalist

See also
Paul Bergé (1881–1970), American symphony conductor